Prayers on Fire is the debut studio album by Australian rock group The Birthday Party, which was released on 6 April 1981 on the Missing Link label in Australia, later licensed to the 4AD label. This was the band's first full-length release on an international record label and the first after changing the group's name from The Boys Next Door to The Birthday Party. It was recorded at Armstrong's Audio Visual Studios in Melbourne and Richmond Recorders in the nearby suburb of Richmond, between December 1980 and January 1981.

Background
In February 1980 Melbourne-based new wave group, The Boys Next Door, changed their name to The Birthday Party. They consisted of the same lineup of Phill Calvert on drums, Nick Cave on vocals, Mick Harvey on guitar, Rowland S. Howard on guitar and Tracy Pew on bass guitar. They relocated to London and soon signed with the 4AD label which issued the extended play, The Friend Catcher in the United Kingdom. In July, their Australian label, Missing Link Records, released "Mr Clarinet" from the EP as a single. In November Missing Link followed with a compilation album, The Birthday Party under the band names The Boys Next Door and The Birthday Party, which combined previously issued EP and singles tracks with some previously unreleased material.

Also in November 1980, The Birthday Party returned to Australia and toured. According to Australian music historian, Ian McFarlane, "It was during this time that the band cemented its reputation as a peerless live act, with its omnipresent influence settling over the Melbourne scene". On 6 April 1981 they issued the album and followed in June with its lead single, "Nick the Stripper". The group returned to London.

Members of Melbourne jazz rock band Equal Local contributed the brass section to "Nick the Stripper" – tenor saxophonist Mick Hauser was mis-credited as Mick Hunter. Equal Local had formed in 1980 by Dean Richards on guitar, Philip Jackson on synthesisers, trumpet and rhythm generator, Melissa Webb on synthesiser and piano, Bryce Perrin on acoustic bass, and Hauser. Richards and Jackson were bandmates from post punk rockers, Whirlywirld and contemporaries of The Boys Next Door. Equal Local disbanded in early 1982.

Composition and recording
In Melbourne, in December 1980 and January 1981, they joined engineer and producer, Tony Cohen, in Armstrong's Audio Visual Studios (A.A.V. Studio 2) and Richmond Recorders, to record their tracks. Music journalist, Toby Creswell, noted that the band "struggled with creating their own identity some of them also began indulging an appetite for alcohol and heroin". Cave was embarrassed by "Zoo Music Girl" but noted "we were digging for something and we kind of just found it with some songs" and cited "King Ink" as an example of "a certain kind of sound that we wanted to work with on records after that". Eight of the eleven tracks on Prayers on Fire were written or co-written by Cave, "[it] was a kind of reaction to the major disappointments we felt when we went to England... [we] began to see a vision and I don't think we were positively influenced ... we didn't want to be like the English New Wave pop groups of the time". Pew observed "[it] stinks, quite honestly ... The engineer slept through the entire session for a start".

Reception

About.com's Anthony Carew felt Prayers on Fire was able to "capture the qualities of their infamous live-shows on record ... the evocatively-produced set dared dress key cuts in blaring brass; giving a sense of perverted-cabaret to their mordant racket, turning Cave from nihilist, self-destructive savant to theatrical, flamboyant showman". AllMusic's Greg Maurer found "a fascination with the dark, (self-)destructive side of religion is more than evident in his later work... While there might not be any of the explicit Biblical imagery on [the album] that Cave would later ejaculate, the title ... is apt". Ian McFarlane stated it showed the band was "irrevocably and unashamedly changing for the better, being more aggressive than anything they had ever recorded". SoundStageDirect described it as "a creepy carnival of tribal rhythms, wonky discordance and garbled surrealism". Music critic Ed St John summarised, "this is an expression which ebbs out beyond the confines of proficiently played music ... [it] is akin to watching a film of Jackson Pollock painting or listening to Dylan Thomas in full alcoholic flight".

The track "Ho-Ho" is featured in the 2004 German film, Head-On.

Accolades

Track listing

Personnel
The Birthday Party members
 Nick Cave – lead vocals, piano (track 7), saxophone (track 9), drums (track 11)
 Rowland S. Howard – guitar, backing vocals, lead vocals (track 5), saxophone (track 11)
 Mick Harvey – organ, piano, guitar, snare drum (track 7), 
 Tracy Pew – bass guitar, clarinet (track 8), double bass (track 9)
 Phill Calvert – drums

Equal Local members on "Nick the Stripper"
 Phillip Jackson – trumpet
 Mick Hauser – tenor saxophone (incorrectly credited as "Mick Hunter")
 Stephen Ewart – trombone

Recording details
 Producer – Tony Cohen, The Birthday Party
 Engineer – Tony Cohen
 Studios – Armstrong's Audio Visual Studios (tracks 1–5, 7–9, 12–13), Richmond Recorders (tracks 6, 10, 11)
Mixing studios – Armstrong's Audio Visual Studios (tracks 6, 10, 11)

Art work
Photography – Jenny, Polly Borland, Evan English (cover photo)

Chart positions

References

General
  Note: Archived [on-line] copy has limited functionality
Specific

External links
The Birthday Party lyrics from Nick Cave Online

1981 albums
The Birthday Party (band) albums
Albums produced by Tony Cohen
4AD albums
Virgin Records albums
Shock Records albums
2.13.61 albums
Buddah Records albums